Runge Independent School District is a public school district based in Runge, Texas (USA).

The district has two campuses - Runge High (Grades 7-12) and Runge Elementary (Grades PK-6).

In 2009, the school district was rated "recognized" by the Texas Education Agency.

References

External links
 

School districts in Karnes County, Texas